The 1989 State of Origin series was the eighth time the annual three-game series between New South Wales and Queensland was contested entirely under 'state of origin' selection rules. It was Queensland's second consecutive Origin clean-sweep and an unpleasant inauguration for New South Wales' new coach Jack Gibson who, along with a new captain in Gavin Miller and eight new players, was brought into a dramatically overhauled Blues side that had lost its five last State of Origin matches.

Game I
Jack Gibson had never before coached at representative level and turned from Origin commentator to coach. He was pitted against his good friend and golfing buddy Arthur Beetson who had been recalled as Queensland coach to take over from Wayne Bennett. With experienced Blues Peter Sterling, Brett Kenny and Wayne Pearce all retired from representative football, New South Wales were forced to elevate some debutantes and only four players in game I of 1989 were in the squad from game III of 1988 - Garry Jack, John Ferguson, Des Hasler and Andrew Ettingshausen.

Queensland's Michael Hancock became the youngest State of Origin footballer from either state that night. Hancock was one of four Maroons making their Origin debut in Game 1, the others being Kerrod Walters, Dan Stains and reserve forward Gary Coyne.

Gavin Miller had not represented for New South Wales since 1983 but was selected and posted as skipper. Daley showed his nerves when missed his first shot on goal, a penalty from only 15 metres out from the posts and directly in front when Qld were leading 6–0. Also making their debut for NSW were Chris Johns, Mario Fenech, 1986 Kangaroo Tourist and World Cup Final second rower Paul Sironen, and reserve forward Glenn Lazarus. Winger Johns, normally a centre with the Brisbane Broncos, made history by becoming the first player chosen to represent NSW Origin while playing for a Queensland-based club.

The game seemed to start well for the Blues as Maroons winger Alan McIndoe knocked on fielding the kick off. From the scrum win NSW applied the pressure and forced a line drop out, but Qld quickly gained the upper hand. Wally Lewis put up a towering goal line drop out that landed some 8 metres on the Blues side of halfway and was let bounce by NSW fullback Garry Jack instead of catching the ball and putting the Blues back on the attack. Jack fielded the bouncing ball just inside his own quarter line allowing the Qld defence to trap NSW in their own half. From there things just went from bad to worse for NSW as Queensland seemed to make line breaks and score tries at will. Michael Hancock scored two tries in his Origin debut, while Mal Meninga signalled his return to representative football with two tries and four goals of his own. Also scoring for the Maroons were Langer, McIndoe and Bobby Lindner. However, on the night there was none better than Martin Bella whose powerhouse performance in the front row gave the likes of Wally Lewis and Allan Langer the room they needed and earned him the Man of the Match award.

The many Blues new faces were overwhelmed and suffered what was New South Wales' biggest losing margin: 30 points. Only a late try to reserve back Andrew Ettingshausen who grounded a kick from his Cronulla club mate Gavin Miller, prevented NSW from losing the game 36–0.

Game II

Queensland wrapped up the 1989 series in game II in probably their most courageous effort in Origin history. They lost Allan Langer with a broken leg, Mal Meninga with a fractured eye socket and Paul Vautin with an elbow injury by half-time. In the second half, Michael Hancock came off with a bruised shoulder while Bob Lindner played on with a fracture in his ankle which he carried for much of the match before retiring five minutes from the end, leaving the Maroons down to 12 men.

Lindner, who stayed on the field despite his injury as there were no reserves left, claimed it was the toughest match in which he had played and Wally Lewis, who scored a memorable 40-metre try, rated it as Queensland's greatest performance. Maroon's coach Beetson was irate at the Blues' intimidating tactics, claiming New South Wales hard man Peter Kelly was allowed by referee Manson to get away with illegal tackling.

The day before the game, some NSW players entered Jack Gibson's hotel room to talk to him and were reportedly shocked to find their coach entertaining the enemy. In the room, long-time friends Gibson and Maroons coach Arthur Beetson were enjoying a drink and playing cards.

Despite the 36-6 thrashing in Game 1, the NSW public got behind their team which resulted in a capacity crowd of 40,000 attending Game 2 at the Sydney Football Stadium. To date this was the second largest Sydney crowd in Origin history after the 42,048 that had attended Game 2 of the 1987 series at the Sydney Cricket Ground.

Game III

The first points came after Queensland hooker Kerrod Walters made a break from dummy half within his own half and passed on to his winger Alan McIndoe to run forty metres to score. Australian test winger Dale Shearer, who had moved from the bench to starting in the centres replacing the injured Mal Meninga and also took over the goal kicking duties despite the 1988 NSWRL season's top point scorer Gary Belcher playing at fullback, missed the sideline conversion attempt so the score remained 4 nil in favour of the Maroons. After collecting the ball from a scrum win within ten metres of Queensland's line, Blues halfback Greg Alexander dashed forth before passing it to his halves partner Des Hasler who dived over next to the uprights to equalize. Michael O'Connor made no mistake with the conversion and New South Wales were in front 6 - 4. The Maroons hit back when they got the ball after a Blues mistake and from over forty metres out, Michael Hagan kicked downfield for Shearer to beat the defence to and score in the left corner. Shearer missed this conversion as well so Queensland led 8 - 6. New South Wales responded with another try after lock forward Brad Mackay made a break about twenty metres out from Queensland's line before offloading in a tackle to Eastern Suburbs hooker David Trewhella coming through in support to score behind the posts. O'Connor's successful conversion put the score at 12 - 8 in favour of the Blues. New South Wales then crossed twice but were called back both times so the score remained unchanged for the half-time break.

Queensland opened the scoring in the second half when Kerrod Walters again made a break from dummy half, running about forty metres before getting the ball out to support players, who passed on to a flying Michael Hancock to dive over in the left corner. Shearer's third conversion attempt was successful so Queensland had regained the lead at 14 - 12. Garry Jack fumbled as he stooped to pick up a Wally Lewis grubber and Walters dived on the loose ball to score the Maroons' next try. Shearer kicked the extras, giving Queensland a 20 - 12 lead. The Maroons' next try came after playing the ball over twenty metres out and keeping it alive, three players passing from tackles until it went to Gary Belcher who broke for the try-line and scored near the uprights. Shearer's kick was successful so Queensland led 26 - 12. The points kept coming for Queensland who started another movement from within their own half, putting the ball through the hands to players coming through in support until it made its way out to Tony Currie to dive over in the left corner. They didn't stop there though, with Shearer at dummy-half and in an attacking position passing the ball to Lewis before running around him to re-collect it and race through almost untouched to score again. Shearer then converted his own try and the score was 36 - 12.

Teams

New South Wales

Queensland

Sources

External links
 Big League's 25 Years of Origin Collectors' Edition, News Magazines, Surry Hills, Sydney
 State of Origin 1989 at rugbyleagueproject.com

State of Origin series
State of Origin series